Hypotrachyna  is a species of foliose lichen in the family Parmeliaceae. Originally described from specimens collected in Venezuela, it is found in mountains throughout the Neotropics, where it grows on pine and hardwood bark.

References

adaffinis
Lichen species
Lichens described in 1992
Lichens of South America
Taxa named by Harrie Sipman